Białousy  is a village in the administrative district of Gmina Janów, within Sokółka County, Podlaskie Voivodeship, in north-eastern Poland.

The name of the village was first mentioned in 1709 as Wólka Białousów in a church certificate. The name comes from the surname of the family who first came to the area.

The village has a population of 249 as of 2011.

Notable landmarks
A wooden windmill, made in 1880, registration number 431 from March 20, 1979.

References

Villages in Sokółka County